Paraphrynus carolynae is a species of tailless whip scorpion from Mexico and the southwestern United States.

Description
13–20 mm in length, reddish-brown overall, with a darkened carapace.

Range
United States: southern Arizona and southeastern California

Mexico: Sonora, Michoacán, and Morelos

Habitat
Rocky areas, especially with fragmented vertical faces.

Ecology
Like all  tailless whip scorpions, this species is largely nocturnal and feeds on smaller arthropods it feels with its antenniform legs.

Etymology
The specific epithet carolynae was chosen to honor the arachnologist Carolyn L. Mullinex.

Taxonomy
Populations from the Mexican state of Sonora and the U.S. state of Arizona were previously referred to as Paraphrynus mexicanus, but de Armas (2012) assigned the name Paraphrynus carolynae based on morphological differences.

References

Amblypygi
Species described in 2012